Kazemabad (also Romanized as Kāz̧emābād) is a village in Nurabad Rural District, in the Central District of Delfan County, Lorestan Province, Iran. At the 2006 census, its population was 676, in 130 families.

References 

Towns and villages in Delfan County